Artists assistants work with, and often under direct instruction from, artists in the production or preparation of art works.  Many famous and influential artist have worked with assistants including Barbara Hepworth and David Hockney

Famous assistants 
While the names of many artists assistants are never known,  some artists assistants have become famous in their own right either as artists or for their role as assistants. One of the most famous is Salaì who was assistant and pupil of Leonardo da Vinci.

Controversy 
The use of artists assistants has been a controversial issue. The controversy primarily focuses on the assistants not being acknowledged for their work and questions of what constitutes art. David Hockney described Damian Hirst's use of assistants as, "It's a little insulting to craftsmen, skilful craftsmen." This was in response to Hirst's use of assistants to paint his spot paintings. The contemporary artist Jeff Koons uses assistants in a similar way, “I’m basically the idea person," he told an interviewer, "I’m not physically involved in the production. I don’t have the necessary abilities, so I go to the top people.”

There have also been exhibitions about the relationship between artist and assistant such as that at the New York gallery Luxembourg & Dayan which hosted ‘In the Making: Artists, Assistants, and Influence’ – a show tracing the link between artists and their (eventually famous) assistants in 2016

References 

Art history